There were 15 weightlifting events at the 2010 South American Games. Competitions were held over March 26–29.  All games were played at Plaza Mayor.

Medal summary

Medal table

Men

Women

References

 
Weightlifting
South American Games
2010